John Keenan (born 1942 in Dunmore, County Galway) is an Irish former sportsperson. He played Gaelic football with his local club Dunmore McHales and was a member of the Galway senior inter-county team from 1961 until 1970.

References

1942 births
Living people
Dunmore McHales Gaelic footballers
Galway inter-county Gaelic footballers